This is a list of notable women, either famous themselves or closely associated with someone well known, who were killed fighting for human rights.

By year

2022

Nokuthula Mabaso, South Africa - Social movement leader

2020

Fikile Ntshangase, South Africa, anti-mining activist

2018

Marielle Franco, Brazil (born 1979 in Brazil - died 2018 in Brazil) - politician

2017

Emilsen Manyoma, Colombia (1984/1985-2017) - community leader
Shifa Gardi, Iraq (born 1986 in Iran - died 2017 in Iraq) - journalist
Miroslava Breach Velducea, Mexico (born in Mexico 1962 - died in Mexico in 2017) - investigative journalist
Gauri Lankesh, India (born India 1962 - died in India in 2017) - Senior journalist
Daphne Caruana Galizia, Malta (1964-2017) - journalist

2016
 Berta Cáceres (Honduras) - indigenous leader
Jo Cox (1974 - 2016 United Kingdom) - politician
Hande Kader (1993 Turkey - 2016) - LGBTQ rights activist
Nilce de Souza Magalhães, Nicinha (died 2016 in Brazil) - environmental activist whose work focused on Jirau Dam.

2014
 Thuli Ndlovu (South Africa) - social movement leader

2010
Almaas Elman, Somalia (died 2019 in Somalia) - Activist

1965
 Viola Liuzzo (United States) - civil rights activist

1913
Emily Davison (1872 - 1913 United Kingdom) - English suffragette.

References

Lists of people by cause of death
Death-related lists